Souk Ahras is a province (wilaya) in the Aures region in Algeria, named after its capital, Souk Ahras. It stands on the border between Algeria and Tunisia.

Geography 

Souk Ahras is situated in the extreme north east of Algeria. Its area is 4360 km².
Its border to the north is the province of El Taref; in the east is Tunisia; westward is the province of Guelma and the province of Oum el Bouaghi; in the south the province of Tebessa Souk Ahras has a population of 450,000 people.

Relief 
It is composed of three important areas:
 In the north: mountainous region.
 In the south: agricultural area.
 In the centre: lowlands region.

Climate 
The city of Souk Ahras has a semi continental and humid climate, heavy rains in the north in winter and very hot and dry in the south during summer. The rains are 350–750 mm/year and the temperatures vary from 1 °C to 14 °C in winter and from 25 °C to 38 °C in summer.

The fauna is very rich in Souk Ahras, where species such as the hare, partridge, fox, sparrow, ferret, porcupine and barbarian hart can be found. The flora as well is very rich, with species such as:
 Cork oak: 12,000 hectares
 Zeen oak: 4,600 hectares
 Ash-tree
 Flowering ash
 Aleppo pine (Pinus halepensis)
 Cypress tree
 Mastic-tree
 Lavender
 Heather

Trading activities 
Trading activities are widespread in Sedrata and Zaarouria were many public and private companies have been set up:
 National company of painting
 National company of textile
 Brick-making company
 Sedrata metallic company
 Mansouri paper factory
 Hamada dairy
 ALKALAM factory

Agriculture 
The most important activities in this region are: agriculture, breeding and com cultivation. The total area is about 436,000 hectares. 235,000 hectares are consecrated to agriculture.

Infrastructure 
Basic under structures and the railway system:

Main roads: 600 km
Secondary roads: 1600 km.
The railway from Souk Ahras to Annaba is 138.8 km, among which 100 km are electrified.

History
The province was created from Guelma Province in 1984.

Administrative divisions
The province is divided into 10 districts (daïras), which are further divided into 26 communes or municipalities.

Districts

 Bir Bouhouche
 Haddada
 M'Daourouch
 Mechroha
 Merahna
 Ouled Driss
 Oum El Adhaïm
 Sedrata
 Souk Ahras
 Taoura

Communes

 Ain Zana
 Ain Soltane
 Bir Bouhouche
 Drea
 Haddada
 Hanancha
 Khedara
 Khemissa
 M'Daourouch
 Mechroha
 Merahna
 Oued Keberit
 Ouillen
 Ouled Driss
 Ouled Moumem
 Oum El Adhaim
 Ragouba
 Safel El Ouiden
 Sedrata
 Sid Fredj
 Souk Ahras
 Taoura
 Terraguelt
 Tiffech (Tiffeche)
 Zaarouria
 Zouabi

References

 
Provinces of Algeria
States and territories established in 1984